The twin-striped skink (Ablepharus bivittatus) is a skink native to Armenia, Azerbaijan, Turkmenistan, northwestern Iran and Turkey.

References
https://www.iucnredlist.org/species/48839409/48839532

External links

Ablepharus
Reptiles described in 1832
Reptiles of Western Asia
Taxa named by Édouard Ménétries